Jan Garbarek (born 4 March 1947) is a Norwegian jazz saxophonist, who is also active in classical music and world music.

Garbarek was born in Mysen, Østfold, southeastern Norway, the only child of a former Polish prisoner of war, Czesław Garbarek, and a Norwegian farmer's daughter. He grew up in Oslo, stateless until the age of seven, as there was no automatic grant of citizenship in Norway at the time. When he was 21, he married the author Vigdis Garbarek. He is the father of musician and composer Anja Garbarek.

Biography
Garbarek's style incorporates a sharp-edged tone, long, keening, sustained notes, and generous use of silence. He began his recording career in the late 1960s, notably featuring on recordings by the American jazz composer George Russell (such as Electronic Sonata for Souls Loved by Nature). By 1973 he had turned his back on the harsh dissonances of avant-garde jazz, retaining only his tone from his previous approach.  Garbarek gained wider recognition through his work with pianist Keith Jarrett's European Quartet which released the albums Belonging (1974), My Song (1977) and the live recordings Personal Mountains (1979), and Nude Ants (1979). He was also a featured soloist on Jarrett's orchestral works Luminessence (1974) and Arbour Zena (1975).

As a composer, Garbarek tends to draw heavily from Scandinavian folk melodies, a legacy of his Ayler influence. He is also a pioneer of ambient jazz composition, most notably on his 1976 album Dis a collaboration with guitarist Ralph Towner, that featured the distinctive sound of a wind harp on several tracks. This textural approach, which rejects traditional notions of thematic improvisation (best exemplified by Sonny Rollins) in favour of a style described by critics Richard Cook and Brian Morton as "sculptural in its impact", has been critically divisive. Garbarek's more meandering recordings are often labeled as new-age music, or spiritual ancestors thereof. Other experiments have included setting a collection of poems of Olav H. Hauge to music, with a single saxophone complementing a full mixed choir; this has led to notable performances with Grex Vocalis. In the 1980s, Garbarek's music began to incorporate synthesizers and elements of world music. He has collaborated with Indian and Pakistani musicians such as Trilok Gurtu, Zakir Hussain, Hariprasad Chaurasia, and Bade Fateh Ali Khan.  Garbarek is credited for composing original music for the 2000 film Kippur.

In 1994, during heightened popularity of Gregorian chant, his album Officium, a collaboration with early music vocal performers the Hilliard Ensemble, became one of ECM's biggest-selling albums of all time, reaching the pop charts in several European countries and was followed by a sequel, Mnemosyne, in 1999. Officium Novum, another sequel album, was released in September 2010. In 2005, his album In Praise of Dreams was nominated for a Grammy Award. Garbarek's first live album Dresden was released in 2009.

Awards and honors
 1999: Knight 1st Class of the Order of St. Olav
 2004: Norwegian Arts Council Award
 2014: Willy Brandt Award

Discography

As leader 
 1967: Til Vigdis (Norsk Jazzforbund, 1967)
 1969: Esoteric Circle (Flying Dutchman, 1971)
 1970: Afric Pepperbird (ECM, 1971)
 1970: Hav with Jan Erik Vold (Philips, 1971)
 1971: Sart with Terje Rypdal (ECM, 1971)
 1972: Triptykon (ECM, 1973)
 1973: Witchi-Tai-To with Bobo Stenson (ECM, 1974)
 1975: Dansere with Bobo Stenson (ECM, 1976)
 1976: Dis with Ralph Towner (ECM, 1977)
 1977: Places with Bill Connors (ECM, 1978)
 1978: Photo with Blue Sky, White Cloud, Wires, Windows and a Red Roof with Bill Connors (ECM, 1979)
 1979: Aftenland with Kjell Johnsen (ECM, 1980)
 1980: Eventyr with John Abercrombie and Naná Vasconcelos (ECM, 1981)
 1981: Paths, Prints with Bill Frisell (ECM, 1982)
 1983: Wayfarer with Bill Frisell and Eberhard Weber (ECM, 1983)
 1984: It's OK to Listen to the Gray Voice with David Torn (ECM, 1985)
 1986: All Those Born with Wings (ECM, 1987)
 1988: Legend of the Seven Dreams with Rainer Brüninghaus (ECM, 1988) 
 1989:  with Agnes Buen Garnås (ECM, 1989)
 1990: I Took Up the Runes (ECM, 1990)
 1990: Ragas and Sagas with Ustad Fateh Ali Khan (ECM, 1992)
 1991: StAR with Miroslav Vitouš (ECM, 1991)
 1992: Stemmer with Vigdis Garbarek (NRK, 1992)
 1992: Madar with Anouar Brahem and Shaukat Hussain (ECM, 1994)
 1992: Twelve Moons (ECM, 1993)
 1994: Officium with the Hilliard Ensemble (ECM, 1994) – live
 1994: Trollsyn (TrollCD, 1994) – for promotion
 1995: Visible World (ECM, 1996)
 1998: Rites (ECM, 1998)   
 1998: Mnemosyne with the Hilliard Ensemble (ECM, 1999)
 2003: In Praise of Dreams (ECM, 2004)
 2003: Dresden (ECM, 2009) – live
 2009: Officium Novum with the Hilliard Ensemble (ECM, 2010) – live
 2014: Remember Me, My Dear with the Hilliard Ensemble (ECM, 2019)

As sideman 

With Egberto Gismonti
 Sol Do Meio Dia (ECM, 1977)
 My Song (ECM, 1978)

With Charlie Haden and Egberto Gismonti
 Magico (ECM, 1980)
 Folk Songs (ECM, 1981)
 Magico: Carta de Amor (ECM, 2012)

With Keith Jarrett
 1974: Belonging (ECM, 1974)
 1974: Luminessence (ECM, 1975)
 1975: Arbour Zena (ECM, 1976)
 1977: My Song (ECM, 1978)
 1979: Personal Mountains (ECM, 1989)
 1979: Sleeper (ECM, 2012)
 1979: Nude Ants (ECM, 1980)

With Eleni Karaindrou
 Music For Films (ECM, 1991)
 Concert in Athens (ECM, 2013)

With Karin Krog
 Jazz Moments (1966)
 Joy (1968)

With Gary Peacock
 December Poems (ECM, 1977)
 Voice from the Past - Paradigm (ECM, 1981)
 Guamba (ECM, 1987)

With Terje Rypdal
 Bleak House (Polydor, 1968)
 Terje Rypdal (ECM, 1971)

With George Russell
 Electronic Sonata for Souls Loved by Nature (Flying Dutchman, 1969)
 Trip to Prillarguri (Soul Note, 1970)
 Listen to the Silence (Soul Note, 1971)  

With L. Shankar 
 Vision (1983)
 Song for Everyone (1985)

With Ralph Towner
 Solstice (ECM, 1975)
 Solstice/Sound and Shadows (ECM, 1977)

With Jan Erik Vold
 Hav (Philips, 1971)
 Ingentings Bjeller (Polydor, 1977)

With Miroslav Vitouš  
 Universal Syncopations (ECM, 2003)
 Atmos (ECM, 1992)

With Eberhard Weber
 Chorus (ECM, 1984)
 Stages of a Long Journey (ECM, 2007)
 Résumé (ECM, 2012)
 Hommage à Eberhard Weber (ECM, 2015)

With others
 Bill Connors, Of Mist and Melting (ECM, 1977)
 David Darling, Cycles (ECM, 1981)
 Paul Giger, Alpstein (ECM, 1991)
 Trilok Gurtu, Living Magic (1990)
 Zakir Hussain, Making Music with John McLaughlin and Hariprasad Chaurasia (ECM, 1986)
 Giya Kancheli, Caris Mere (1995)
 Kim Kashkashian, Monodia (ECM, 2004) – rec. 2002
 Manu Katché, Neighbourhood (ECM, 2005) – rec. 2004
 Art Lande, Red Lanta (ECM, 1974) – rec. 1973
 Marilyn Mazur, Elixir (ECM, 2008) – rec. 2005
 Kenny Wheeler, Deer Wan (ECM, 1978) – rec. 1977

References

External links

Jan Garbarek on ECM Records

Jan Garbarek Group @ Theatre Lycabettus concert review, Greece
 

1947 births
Living people
People from Eidsberg
Avant-garde jazz musicians
Spellemannprisen winners
Norwegian people of Polish descent
Freedom Records artists
ECM Records artists
20th-century Norwegian saxophonists
21st-century Norwegian saxophonists
Norwegian jazz saxophonists
Norwegian jazz composers
20th-century saxophonists
20th-century Norwegian male musicians
21st-century Norwegian male musicians